The 1942 Cupa României Final was the 9th final of Romania's most prestigious football cup competition. It was disputed between Universitatea Cluj-Sibiu and Rapid București, and was won by Rapid București after a game with 8 goals. It was the seventh cup for Rapid, and the sixth out of six consecutive successes.

Match details

See also 
List of Cupa României finals

References

External links
Romaniansoccer.ro

1942
Cupa
Romania